The Alice T. Miner Museum, also known as Alice T. Miner Colonial Collection, is located at Chazy in Clinton County, New York on the Adirondack Coast. Opened in 1924, the museum was created by Alice T. Miner, a pioneer in the colonial revival movement and wife of William H. Miner, railroad industrialist.

The museum has 15 rooms filled with period furniture, miniature furniture, a vast china collection, porcelain and glass, a superb collection of early samplers and other textiles, War of 1812 muskets, Revolutionary War cannonballs, dolls and other early Americana.

The building was added to the National Register of Historic Places in 2010.

References

External links
 Alice T. Miner Museum - official site

Houses on the National Register of Historic Places in New York (state)
Historic house museums in New York (state)
Museums in Clinton County, New York
Museums established in 1924
1924 establishments in New York (state)
National Register of Historic Places in Clinton County, New York